The 2nd constituency of Val-d'Oise is a French legislative constituency in the Val-d'Oise département.  It is currently represented by Guillaume Vuilletet of La République En Marche! (LREM).

Description

The 2nd constituency of Val d'Oise runs as a thin strip of territory across the centre of the department from north to south and encompasses one canton from Cergy part of the Cergy-Pontoise new town.

Since 1988 the seat has swung between left and right in line with national trends, however at the 2012 elections it was held by the UMP thus defying this pattern.

In the 2010 redistricting of French legislative constituencies, the department of Val-d'Oise was granted an  additional seat, the 10th constituency. This  was created by taking two cantons from the 2nd constituency.

Historic Representation

Election results

2022

 
 
 
 
 
 
 
 
|-
| colspan="8" bgcolor="#E9E9E9"|
|-

2017

2012

 
 
 
 
 
|-
| colspan="8" bgcolor="#E9E9E9"|
|-

2007

 
 
 
 
 
 
 
|-
| colspan="8" bgcolor="#E9E9E9"|
|-

2002

 
 
 
 
 
|-
| colspan="8" bgcolor="#E9E9E9"|
|-

1997

 
 
 
 
 
 
 
 
|-
| colspan="8" bgcolor="#E9E9E9"|
|-

Sources

Official results of French elections from 2002: "Résultats électoraux officiels en France" (in French).

2